L'Assomption—Montcalm was a federal electoral district in Quebec, Canada, that was represented in the House of Commons of Canada from 1917 to 1935.

This riding was created in 1914 from parts of L'Assomption and Montcalm ridings. It consisted of the Counties of Montcalm and L'Assomption.

The district was abolished in 1933 when it was redistributed into Joliette—L'Assomption—Montcalm and Terrebonne ridings. Its only member of parliament was Paul-Arthur Séguin of the Liberal Party of Canada.

Members of Parliament

This riding elected the following Members of Parliament:

Election results

See also 

 List of Canadian federal electoral districts
 Past Canadian electoral districts

External links
Riding history from the Library of Parliament

Former federal electoral districts of Quebec